Lachnospermum, common name rooiblombos, is a genus of South African flowering plants in the family Asteraceae.

 Species
 Lachnospermum fasciculatum (Thunb.) Baill. - Cape Province of South Africa
 Lachnospermum imbricatum (P.J.Bergius) Hilliard - South Africa
 Lachnospermum umbellatum (D.Don) Pillans - Cape Province of South Africa

References

Gnaphalieae
Asteraceae genera
Endemic flora of South Africa